Simple Life is a collection of solo acoustic songs by Mason Jennings. It was released in 2002 on Architect Records.

Track listing 
"Hospitals and Jails" - 3:55
"Isabel" - 3:40
"Lilacs" - 1:45
"Simple Life" - 1:00
"Summer Dress" - 2:10
"Little Details" - 2:32
"Isabella Part II" - 3:19
"In My Grave" - 2:57
"Family Tree" - 2:34
"Ain't Gonna Die" - 2:40
"Amphetamine Girl" - 2:11
"12/8 Time" - 2:36
"Rebecca DeVille" - 7:02

References 

2002 albums
Mason Jennings albums